Adel Al-Hosani (Arabic:عادل الحوسني) (born 23 August 1989) is an association football player who plays for Al Sharjah SC.

International
He made his debut for the United Arab Emirates national football team on 26 March 2019 in a friendly against Syria.

External link

Reference

Emirati footballers
1989 births
Living people
United Arab Emirates international footballers
Al Wahda FC players
Sharjah FC players
Asian Games medalists in football
Footballers at the 2010 Asian Games
Asian Games silver medalists for the United Arab Emirates
Place of birth missing (living people)
UAE Pro League players
Association football goalkeepers
Medalists at the 2010 Asian Games